The 2020 Kansas City Chiefs season was the Kansas City Chiefs' 51st in the National Football League (NFL), their 61st season overall and their eighth under head coach Andy Reid. The Chiefs, who entered the  season as defending Super Bowl LIV champions, qualified for the playoffs for the sixth consecutive season, tying a franchise record set from 1990 to 1995 and won the division for the fifth consecutive year. They finished with a franchise-record and league-leading 14 wins. The Chiefs appeared in Super Bowl LV, their second consecutive Super Bowl appearance and fourth in franchise history, but lost to the Tampa Bay Buccaneers, 31-9. With the loss, the Chiefs became the sixth defending Super Bowl champion to lose the next year's game, after the 1978 Dallas Cowboys, the 1983 Washington Redskins, the 1997 Green Bay Packers, the 2014 Seattle Seahawks, and the 2017 New England Patriots.

Season summary

In the offseason, the Chiefs released the longest tenured player in franchise history, punter Dustin Colquitt, who had been with the team since 2005. Colquitt was later signed to the Chiefs practice squad shortly before the playoffs.

The biggest move of the offseason, however, was signing quarterback Patrick Mahomes to a ten-year, $503-million-dollar extension, the largest contract in American sports history.

On August 17, the Chiefs announced that due to the COVID-19 pandemic, their stadium will be filled at about 22% capacity, or about 16,000 fans. Additionally, fans in attendance will be required to wear a face covering when they are not actively eating or drinking. Season tickets were not sold, however, season ticket holders from 2019 that have not cancelled season tickets already, will still have the option to buy season tickets in 2021.

After a 34–20 Week 3 win over the Baltimore Ravens, the Chiefs set a franchise record for consecutive wins including the playoffs with 12. The streak was snapped two weeks later at 13 with a Week 5 loss to the Las Vegas Raiders. Following a Week 4 victory over the New England Patriots, the Chiefs became the first team in NFL history to open their season 4–0 in four consecutive seasons. The Chiefs clinched their fifth consecutive AFC West title after defeating the Miami Dolphins in Week 14. The victory also gave the Chiefs their first 12–1 record in franchise history. A Week 16 victory over the Atlanta Falcons gave the Chiefs their franchise record 14th win. It also clinched home-field advantage throughout the playoffs. The Chiefs finished the season undefeated on the road for the first time in franchise history and with a 14–2 overall record, the best in the NFL during the season. In doing so, the Chiefs became the first team since the 2016 New England Patriots to achieve an 8-0 road record in the regular season.

Following their win in the divisional round of the playoffs against the Browns, Kansas City became the first AFC team ever to host three consecutive conference championship games, and the second team in NFL history to host three consecutive conference championships. The other team was the Philadelphia Eagles from 2002–04, who were also coached by Andy Reid. The win also gave the Chiefs their 3rd consecutive season winning at least one playoff game, after losing 11 of their previous 12 playoff games. In the AFC Championship, the Chiefs beat the Buffalo Bills 38–24 and advanced to Super Bowl LV, their second consecutive Super Bowl appearance and fourth all-time Super Bowl appearance. They went on to lose to the Tampa Bay Buccaneers in the Super Bowl, becoming the first team since the 2017 New England Patriots to win a Super Bowl but lose the following one the next season.

NFL Top 100

The Chiefs had six players named to the Top 100. Tight end Travis Kelce is the only player who was ranked higher than the previous season. Defending Super Bowl MVP quarterback Patrick Mahomes was the highest rated Chiefs player on the list at fourth. Mahomes selection of fourth (behind fellow quarterbacks Lamar Jackson and Russell Wilson, as well as defensive tackle Aaron Donald) drew criticism from multiple NFL analysts and fans. SB Nation’s Chiefs site Arrowhead Pride said they will no longer report on the Top 100 following Mahomes being selected fourth.

Offseason

Coaching staff changes

Players added
Below are players signed following the conclusion of the 2019 season, some of the players signed spent a portion of the 2019 NFL season on the practice squad and/or active roster.

Players lost
Below are players who were on the roster at the end of the 2019 season, but were either released or did not re-sign after their contract expired.

Draft

Trades
 The Chiefs traded linebacker Dee Ford to the San Francisco 49ers in exchange for their 2nd round draft pick (63rd overall).
 The Chiefs traded their 2nd round selection (64th overall), in addition to 2019 draft picks, to the Seattle Seahawks in exchange for defensive end Frank Clark and a 2019 draft pick.
 The Chiefs traded their 6th round selection (211th overall) to the New York Jets in exchange for linebacker Darron Lee
 The Chiefs traded their 7th round selection (246th overall) to the Miami Dolphins in exchange for safety Jordan Lucas.
 The Chiefs traded their 6th round pick in 2021 NFL Draft to the Tennessee Titans in exchange for their 237th pick in the 2020 draft.

Undrafted free agents

Signed and released in the offseason
Below are players who were signed and released in the offseason before playing a game for the Chiefs in the 2020 season. These players were not a part of the final roster cut downs prior to the start of the regular season.

COVID-19 opt-outs
On July 24, 2020, NFL owners and the NFL Players Association approved giving players the option to opt out of playing during the entire 2020 season as precaution due to the COVID-19 pandemic. The players listed below opted-out before the August 6 deadline and did not play.

Final roster cutdown
The following players were released to bring the roster to the league mandated 53 players before week 1. In addition to the following 24 players being released, the Chiefs also placed two players on the reserve/suspended list and placed one player on the PUP list.

In-season transactions
All transactions listed in this section occurred after the Chiefs released their initial 53 player roster.

Suspensions served
The players listed below served a suspension at some point during the season. The length, reason, and weeks served are all listed below.

Signings

Practice squad elevations

Trades

Cuts

Injured reserve returns
The following players spent a portion of the season on injured reserve and were eventually activated off of it.

Staff

Final roster

     Starters in bold.

Preseason cancellation
The Chiefs' preseason schedule was announced on May 7, but was later cancelled due to the COVID-19 pandemic.

Regular season

Schedule
As the defending Super Bowl champions, the Chiefs earned the right to host the NFL Kickoff Game, which occurred on September 10. The Chiefs' 2020 schedule was announced on May 7.

Note: Intra-division opponents are in bold text.

Game summaries

Week 1: vs. Houston Texans
NFL Kickoff Game

Week 2: at Los Angeles Chargers

Week 3: at Baltimore Ravens

Week 4: vs. New England Patriots

Week 5: vs. Las Vegas Raiders

Week 6: at Buffalo Bills

Week 7: at Denver Broncos

Week 8: vs. New York Jets

Week 9: vs. Carolina Panthers

Week 11: at Las Vegas Raiders

Week 12: at Tampa Bay Buccaneers

Week 13: vs. Denver Broncos

Week 14: at Miami Dolphins

Week 15: at New Orleans Saints

Week 16: vs. Atlanta Falcons

Week 17: vs. Los Angeles Chargers

Standings

Division

Conference

Postseason

Schedule

Game summaries

AFC Divisional Playoffs: vs. (6) Cleveland Browns

AFC Championship: vs. (2) Buffalo Bills

Super Bowl LV: vs. (N5) Tampa Bay Buccaneers

Notes

References

External links
 

Kansas City
Kansas City Chiefs seasons
Kansas City Chiefs
AFC West championship seasons
American Football Conference championship seasons